Edith Barney [Little Red] (February 3, 1923 – March 23, 2010) was a female catcher who played for the All-American Girls Professional Baseball League during the  season. Listed at 5' 6", 136 lb., she batted and threw right-handed.

She died in North Port, Florida, at the age of 87.

Sources

All-American Girls Professional Baseball League players
Grand Rapids Chicks players
Sportspeople from Bridgeport, Connecticut
1923 births
2010 deaths
Baseball players from Connecticut
People from North Port, Florida
21st-century American women